Nationality words link to articles with information on the nation's poetry or literature (for instance, Irish or France).

Events

Works published

France
Joachim du Bellay, Les Regrets, France
 Jean Antoine de Baïf, 
 Louise Labé,  ("Complete Works"), including her prose "", three elegies and 24 sonnets (one in Italian), as well as 24 poems in her honor by others; published by the noted Lyon printer, Jean de Tournes; the first edition ran through two printings; reprinted again in 1556, with spelling corrections; her sonnets have been often republished and translated
 Jacques Peletier du Mans,  ("The Art of Poetry"), French criticism
 Pierre de Ronsard:
 , addresses and panegyrics
 
 
 
 Pontus de Tyard, 
 Jean Vauquelin de la Fresnaye,

Great Britain
 John Heywood,  (see also  1550;  1560, Works 1562
 Mirror for Magistrates, anthology of poems about great historical figures of England, first edition; published by John Weyland, who was apparently denied a license to publish by the Lord Chancellor Stephen Gardiner, effectively suppressing the work and putting Weyland out of business (the book was revived and published in 1559, third edition 1563, fourth edition 1574, another edition 1610)
 Henry Lovel, eighth Baron Morley, publication year uncertain; translated from the Italian of Petrarch's Trionfi

Other
 Girolamo Fracastoro, also known as "Fracastorius", Collected Works, including poems and Naugerius, criticism

Births
Death years link to the corresponding "[year] in poetry" article:
 Heinrich Meibom (died 1625), German historian and poet
 Keshavdas (died 1617), Sanskrit scholar and Hindi poet
 François de Malherbe born (died 1628), French
 Israel ben Moses Najara born about this year (died c. 1625), Hebrew poet in Palestine
 Vavřinec Benedikt z Nudožer, also known as Laurentio Benedictino Nudozierino (died 1615), Slovak
 Gabriel Lobo Lasso de la Vega (died 1615), Castilian Spanish poet, playwright and historian
 Thomas Watson (died 1592), English lyrical poet who wrote in English and Latin

Deaths
Birth years link to the corresponding "[year] in poetry" article:
 Sir David Lindsay (born 1490), Scottish

See also

 Poetry
 16th century in poetry

Notes

16th-century poetry
Poetry